Following the 2020 Nagorno-Karabakh war and in accordance with 2020 Nagorno-Karabakh ceasefire agreement, Republic of Azerbaijan re-established authority on the part of the territories, previously de facto controlled by the breakaway Republic of Artsakh, which allowed Azerbaijan to begin construction projects and rehabilitation in areas of the Karabakh, many of which had been practically leveled since Azerbaijan lost control of them in the 1990s.

Post-conflict condition and reconstruction 

Azerbaijan recovered many of its territories during and after the 2020 Nagorno-Karabakh war, which culminated by the ceasefire deal on 9 November 2020. The ceasefire allowed rehabilitation to begin in places where Azerbaijan re-established authority, many of which had been practically leveled since Azerbaijan lost control of them in the 1990s.  Government-sponsored sources present these plans as "Great Return" or "Big Return". At the 11th Session of the World Urban Forum, President of the Republic of Azerbaijan Ilham Aliyev claimed that huge mine pollution is the main challenge, which slowing down reconstruction and return of internally displaced individuals.

Paul Gavan, PACE rapporteur on the 'Humanitarian consequences of the conflict between Armenia and Azerbaijan', stated in his report that:

According to US Department of State Azerbaijani government is looking for new investments in the areas around Nagorno-Karabakh that were previously controlled by Armenia-backed separatists. Azerbaijan allocated USD 1.3 billion from the budget for the rehabilitation and reconstruction of these lands. These funds will apparently be utilized to rehabilitate infrastructure, education, and healthcare sectors, as well as cultural and historical landmarks. Reconstruction is projected to continue in the future years, with specific financial provisions continuing to be made for demining, reconstructing, and resettling.

Agdam 
On 20 November 2020, the city of Aghdam and its surrounding district were returned to Azerbaijan as part of the ceasefire agreement. Plans were announced to construct a 44.5-kilometer-long highway linking Agdam to the city of Barda. On 28 May 2021, President Aliyev laid the foundation stone for the project.

Fuzuli 

On 16 November 2020, the foundation stone for the construction of a highway linking the cities of Fuzuli and Shusha was laid. The highway was planned to integrate into a wider scheme to construct a highway to the municipality of Ahmadbeyli. Plans indicate that the road would be 101.5 km in length and 37.7m wide. 
On 26 October 2021, Fuzuli International Airport was inaugurated. Turkey-based companies constructed the airport at a cost of 75 million manats ($44 million). The first flight test to the airport took place on August 22, 2021.

Hadrut 
Construction works in Hadrut, which came under Azerbaijan's control on October 9, 2020, began with the restoration of roads. On March 15, 2021, President Aliyev laid the foundation for the Fuzuli–Hadrut highway with a length of 13 km.
.
It has been noted that the Hadrut–Jabrayil–Shukurbayli, which passes through Jabrayil District, will be connected to the Hajigabul–Minjivan–Zangazur highway in Shukurbeyli. The road, which is planned to be 43 km in length, will have 4 lanes and road bridges built along. Moreover, it was reported that the construction of the 18-kilometer-long Tugh–Hadrut highway was underway.

Kalbajar 
On 23 July 2021, construction began on the construction of a highway linking Toganali, Istisu and Kalbajar. The 81-kilometer long highway would connect Goygol District and Kalbajar District.

On 16 August 16, 2021, the foundation stone for the Murovdag tunnel was laid. The tunnel will form part of an 11.6-kilometer highway.

On 16 August 16, 2021, the foundation stone for a 3.4-kilometer-long tunnel was laid. It is planned that the tunnel will be a part of a 72.8-kilometer-long highway that is intended to link Kalbajar with Lachin. A second connection between Kalbajar and Lachin districts is also planned - the Istisu–Minkend road.

Qubadli 
On 25 October 2021, the foundation stone for a highway connecting Khanlig and Qubadli was laid and a substation of Azerenerji in Qubadli was opened. On the same day, a 50-meter-high radio and television broadcasting tower was erected in Khanlig village. Two 76-kilometer-long power lines (Qubadli-1 and Qubadli-2) were installed from Shukurbayli and Jabrayil substations to connect Qubadli to the general energy system of Azerbaijan.

Shusha 

Following Azerbaijan taking control of the city in the Battle of Shusha and the subsequent end of the war, Azerbaijan's government embarked on a major construction plan to restore the city, attracting substantial criticism including due to a lack of transparency. Some former Azerbaijani residents of the city also expressed discontent with the demolition of buildings due to them wanting to return to their homes as well as due to their opinions not being taken into consideration. Among the buildings being demolished were those constructed by the Armenian authorities while they controlled the city, including a new parliament building, apparently in order to make room for the construction of a mosque.

In January 2021, plans were announced for the construction of a five-star hotel in the city of Shusha. Restoration of the Shusha fortress began in early February 2021.

In early May 2021, the government announced that it would commence repairs to Ghazanchetsots Cathedral which was twice struck with missiles by the Azerbaijaini military during the 2020 war.

In early June 2021, it was announced that three mosques in Shusha — Ashagi Govhar Agha, Yukhari Govhar Agha and Saatli — would be restored by the Heydar Aliyev Foundation. On June 22, the "Shusha City State Reserve Department" was established.

On January 14, 2021, restoration works began on Vagif Mausoleum and it was opened on August 29.

Zangilan 
On 14 February 14, 2021, the foundation stone of a railway line linking Horadiz, Zangilan and Agband was laid. In making the announcement, the President stated that was intended that the branch would connect Azerbaijan proper with the exclave of the Nakhchivan Autonomous Republic. It was not mentioned how such a line would traverse the territory of the Republic of Armenia.

On March 18, 2021, the "Brotherhood Garden" was opened in Agali village by delegations from the Turkish Ministerty of Agriculture and Forestry (Bekir Pakdemirli) and the Azerbaijani the Ministry of Agriculture of Azerbaijan.

On 1 May 2021, plans were announced for the construction of the Zangilan International Airport.

On 20 October 2021, the President signed an order to make an inventory of natural objects in the Basut-Chay State Reserve and to assess the environmental situation.

On 26 October 2021, the Presidents of Azerbaijan and Turkey announced plans to found an agro-park -"Dost" - to be constructed with the support of Turkey.

On 19 July 2022, the first residents returned to Ağalı village after 29 years. The village has a school, post office, health centre, bank, market and cafe. It is expected that 1300 people will live in the village 

On 21 October 2022, Zangilan International Airport was inaugurated by President Aliyev of Azerbaijan and President Erdoğan of Turkey

Controversies 
It has been reported that during the reconstruction process, various Armenian cultural monuments in the captured areas have been partially or entirely destroyed, including Armenian cemeteries and homes bulldozed in the process of road construction, as well as an 18th/19th century Armenian church. The restoration of Ghazanchetsots Cathedral announcement was met with criticism and concern by the United States Commission on International Religious Freedom and various Armenian groups alike as well.

References 

2020 in Azerbaijan
2021 in Azerbaijan
Aftermath of the 2020 Nagorno-Karabakh war